The 1980 Alitalia Open was a men's tennis tournament played on outdoor clay courts in Florence, Italy that was part of the 1980 Volvo Grand Prix circuit. It was the eighth edition of the tournament and was played from 12 May until 18 May 1980. Sixth-seeded Adriano Panatta won the singles title.

Finals

Singles
 Adriano Panatta defeated  Raúl Ramírez 6–2, 2–6, 6–4
 It was Panatta's 1st singles title of the year and the 10th and last of his career.

Doubles
 Gene Mayer /  Raúl Ramírez defeated  Paolo Bertolucci /  Adriano Panatta 6–1, 6–4

References

External links
 ITF tournament edition details

Alitalia Florence Open
Alitalia Florence Open
ATP Florence